Joyeux is a commune in the Ain department in eastern France.

Geography
The commune includes some thirty lakes which together represent some 4 square kilometres of water. The land between them is of gravel, sand and clay.

History
The fief of Joyeux was mentioned in the twelfth century. In the fifteenth century, it was in the possession of the Villars family.

On 13 February 2006, a wild duck was found dead on the fen. It was the first attested case of the presence of the bird flu virus H5N1 in France.

Administration

Population

Sights
Old farms typical of the region. The nineteenth century Château de Joyeux.

See also
Communes of the Ain department
Dombes

References

External links

Dombes and the city of Joyeux

Communes of Ain
Ain communes articles needing translation from French Wikipedia